Mautâm  is a cyclic ecological phenomenon that occurs every 48–50 years in the northeastern Indian states of Tripura, Mizoram and Manipur, as well as in many places of Assam which are 30% covered by wild bamboo forests, and Chin State in Myanmar, particularly Hakha, Thantlang, Falam, Paletwa and Matupi Townships. It begins with a rat population boom, which in turn creates a widespread famine in those areas.

During mautâm, Melocanna baccifera, a species of bamboo, flowers at one time across a wide area. This event is followed invariably by a plague of black rats in what is called a rat flood. This occurs as the rats multiply in response to the temporary windfall of seeds, and leave the forests to forage on stored grain when the bamboo seeds are exhausted, which in turn causes devastating famine. Famines thus caused have played a significant part in shaping the region's political history. The most recent spate of flowering, on the bamboo species' genetically linked timetable, began in May 2006, and the state government and the Indian Army attempted to prevent a famine.

Mechanism
After flowering, the bamboo dies and regenerates from the seeds. The rodents feast on these seeds, which are plentiful. As a consequence, a sudden boom in the rat population occurs. The action of the bamboo is thought to be an ecological control mechanism (predator satiation). The seeds of any culm of bamboo that might flower off-cycle are all eaten by rodents, thus reinforcing the rhythm of this extreme version of a mast year. Some experts believe that the flower has a positive effect on the fertility of the rats, as well as on increasing the viable size of a rat litter. All available explanations point to the fact that the increase in their numbers during the peak year is a natural after-effect of the flowering of the bamboos. However, once they exhaust this temporarily abundant food supply, the rats turn their attention to cultivated crops.

History
Records from the British Raj indicate that Mizoram suffered famine in 1862 and again in 1911, after the region witnessed similar bamboo flowerings. In each case, the records suggest that the flowering of the bamboo leads to a dramatic increase in the local rat population. The increase led to raids on granaries and the destruction of paddy fields, and subsequently to a year-long famine.

The 1958–59 mautâm resulted in the recorded deaths of at least 100 people, besides heavy loss to human property and crops. Some elderly villagers in the undeveloped, more traditional region, recalling this event, have claimed that their warnings based on folk traditions were dismissed as superstition by the government of Assam, which then ruled what is now the present state of Mizoram. An estimated two million rats were killed and collected by the locals, after a bounty of 40 paisa was placed on each. However, even after the increase in the rat population was noted, preparations by the government to avoid a famine were limited.

This negligence by Assam and Indian government led to the foundation of the Mizo National Famine Front (MNFF), set up to provide relief to the far-flung areas. This body later became the Mizo National Front (MNF), which staged a major uprising in 1966. Under its leader Laldenga (who later became the chief minister of Mizoram), MNF fought a bitter separatist struggle for 20 years against the Indian Army until an accord that guaranteed Mizoram's autonomy as a separate state was signed in 1986.

Chief Minister Zoramthanga, a former guerrilla leader, made preparations for the predicted 2006 mautâm for two years. In June 2006, the Indian Army was pressed into service as an emergency measure to assist the state administration in reaching remote areas. The state administration arranged for alternate food crops to be grown locally, and also arranged for the army to provide instructions on pest control. Villagers were encouraged to grow turmeric and ginger, partially as an insurance against variations in purchasing power, and also because the aromatic spices ward off rodent raids.

Regular rodent outbreaks associated with bamboo flowering (and subsequent fruiting and seeding) also occur in the nearby Indian states of Arunachal Pradesh, Assam, Manipur, and Nagaland, as well as in Laos, Japan, Madagascar, and South America. Thingtâm, a similar famine, occurs with the flowering of another species of bamboo, Bambusa tulda.

Mautam and thingtam have been observed to strictly alternate, with a gap of 18 years from mautam to thingtam and a gap of 30 years from thingtam to mautam. Recorded instances of mautam include 1864, 1910–1912, 1958–1959, and 2007–2008 and those of thingtam include 1880–1884, 1928–1929, and 1976–1977. The next predicted events if this pattern continues are thingtam in 2025–2026 and mautam in 2055–2056.

See also
Bamboo blossom
Population cycle

References

External links.
.
.
.
.

Bamboo
Environment of Manipur
Periodic phenomena
1959 in India
2007 in India
2008 in India
Rodents and humans
Environment of Tripura